Lithops francisci, commonly known as one of the living stones or pebble plants, is in the family Aizoaceae. It is endemic to the arid desert environments of Namibia.  It is a succulent with a natural habitat in rocky areas. L. francisci was assessed by Nicholas Edward Brown in 1925. It is one of the Lithops plants and shares the characteristic bi-leaf head pattern separated by a deep fissure, the bottom of which houses and protects the stunted stem.

Discovery and etymology
L. francisci was first sampled by Kurt Dinter in July 1922 during a research expedition to southern Africa. In 1926, he published his description of the species, naming it after a friend, the Dutch horticulturist Frantz de Laet of Contich.

Habitat and ecology
L. francisci is a desert perennial. It thrives in climates that are dry and have moderately low annual temperatures. It requires coarse, well-drained sandy soils and is therefore usually found on rocky hillsides. Its habitat tends to have a lot of metamorphic rock such as schist and gneiss, which also matches the natural coloration of the plant. This adaptation acts as a camouflage, preventing easy predation of the plant's succulent, nutrient rich tissue.

Distribution
L. francisci is native to Namibia in southern Africa, more specifically, the coastal desert of Namib. It can be found in the southern hills of both Kovisberg and Halenberg. This location was affirmed by horticulturist Werner Tribner, who also studied Lithops and had a species named after him, L. werneri.

Due to the popularity of this species, as well as many of the other Lithops in the succulent plant trade, it can be found in markets across the world. L. francisci was once sold and harvested to the point of threatening the endemic population. Over the past 100 years, thousands of these plants have been dug up and exported from their native habitat. This practice has significantly decreased the effective population size within the small (< ) range of natural occurrence. However, the IUCN reports a decrease in this activity over the last 15 years and though population size and range is still decreasing, the pace has begun to slow.

Morphology
L. francisci is a short succulent dicot with multiple heads (usually three to six, but ranging up to 20). Each head consists of two short thick modified leaves separated by a deep fissure. The face of the plant is elliptical, with usually one leaf being smaller than the other. This elliptical shape is fairly unusual to the L. francisci; other Lithops tend toward a more cordate shape. The face of both leaves are rugose with small channels usually of a different color than the bumps. There are also many dusky dots on the face of the leaf, which are irregularly spread across the entire upward-facing surface. Both the dusky dots and the channels usually appear as greyish-green and the elevated tissue tends to have a cream or beige coloring. Pink, green and yellow tinges have also been observed in the elevated tissue.

The small convex leaves and speckled beige coloration have been known to cause hikers to mistake the plant for a pebble or small rock.

Reproduction
These plants are obligate outcrossers and produce small yellow flowers during their reproductive season in the autumn. Each head may only produce a single flower. The flower emerges as a bud which rises from the central fissure, separating the bifurcated leaves. It tends to maintain through the winter, slowly drawing resources out of the succulent leaves. L. francisci produces a fruit most commonly with 5 loculed capsules, though it has been known to produce a sixth at times.

The seeds of the fruit are yellow to yellowish brown and have a rugose texture coating similar to that of the modified leaf.

References

francisci
Endemic flora of Namibia
Plants described in 1926
Taxa named by N. E. Brown
Taxa named by Kurt Dinter
Taxa named by Martin Heinrich Gustav Schwantes